Asterix and the Banquet ("Asterix's Tour of Gaul") is the fifth volume of the Asterix comic book series, by René Goscinny (stories) and Albert Uderzo (illustrations). It was first serialized in Pilote magazine, issues 172–213, in 1963.

Plot
Inspector General Overanxius arrives in the fortified Roman camp of Compendium on a mission from Julius Caesar to lead the local garrison against the village of indomitable Gauls. Centurion Lotuseatus warns him the Gauls are dangerous, but the attack goes ahead, only to be soundly repelled. Undeterred, Overanxius erects a stockade around the village to prevent the inhabitants from spreading their rebellious ideas through Gaul.

Asterix bets that he and Obelix will escape the village and go on a tour of Gaul, collecting regional culinary specialties for a banquet upon their return. Overanxius promises to raise the stockade if they succeed. Asterix maps out a route, while Obelix fetches a large bag to hold their shopping. The two break through the stockade, while the other villagers create a diversion by attacking the barricade on another front. Overanxius has a rider despatched to alert the entire occupation army to be on the lookout for the pair.

Rotomagus (Rouen): Asterix and Obelix make their way to the Normandy region, where a Roman patrol recognizes them. They flee and escape via a wealthy Roman couple's yacht up the Seine, while the patrol is stymied by the unhelpfully vague responses of local residents.

Lutetia (Paris): Upon arrival, Asterix and Obelix negotiate the traffic jams and buy a ham from a pork butcher shop, where from this point on, Dogmatix (unnamed until the next adventure) follows the duo through Gaul. Fearing detection by a Roman patrol, they purchase a gleaming used chariot and handsome horse from a dishonest salesman to make their escape. They soon discover the horse is slow and was only painted black, while the chariot loses its lustre and a wheel. The duo gets back on track by knocking out the driver of a Roman breakdown chariot and stealing his vehicle.

Camaracum (Cambrai): The Gauls stop in a humbug shop to buy boiled sweets, but are spotted by a Roman patrol, which they beat up, trashing the shop in the process. Unfazed by the damage, the shopkeeper says Gauls are aware of the bet and then demonstrates his solidarity by knocking out the patrol leader. Back on the road, Asterix and Obelix get past another patrol by posing as breakdown men, towing a legionary, Spongefingus, in his damaged chariot, only to then cast him aside on the road.

Rheims (Reims): Asterix and Obelix abandon the breakdown chariot and buy some wines. They are found by Spongefingus, who has recovered from his "accident," but Asterix knocks him down by using a cork exploding from an amphora.

Divodurum (Metz): Leaving Rheims, the pair detours into a forest, where the scent of roast boar leads them to the house of Unpatriotix, who feeds and then betrays them. Roman soldiers come to the house but capture only Asterix, as Obelix is out hunting boar.  When Obelix discovers the ruse, he knocks out a legionary to get imprisoned too and rescues Asterix. After beating up the Romans at the prison, Asterix declares it is too late to buy any of Divodurum's specialties and decides to buy some in Lugdunum. As they leave, the Gauls commandeer a Roman postal cart.

Lugdunum (Lyon): The two Gauls abandon the postal cart and, after crashing through a Roman blockade, meet Jellibabix, head of the resistance movement. He pretends to betray the Gauls to Prefect Poisonous Fungus, but lures the Romans into a maze of back alleys, where the legionaries become hopelessly lost (the prefect's plan to leave behind a trail of pebbles to find his way out backfires when a legionary picks up the pebbles). Jellibabix gives the duo a parcel of sausages and meatballs, and arranges a chariot for them.

Nicae (Nice): En route to Nicae, Asterix and Obelix become stuck in holiday traffic bound for the Gaulish Riviera and stop at an inn for lunch. In Nicae, they buy salad and are once again spotted by a Roman patrol. They escape by sea and commandeer a vacationing Lutetian's rowboat.

Massilia (Marseille): The Gauls stop at Cesar Drinklikafix's inn where, aside from having goat's milk and boar, they buy fish stew. Again, the pair makes a premature departure when a boy warns of approaching Romans, but Drinklikafix and his friends stall the soldiers by blocking the road with a game of pétanque.

Tolosa (Toulouse): En route to Tolosa, Asterix and Obelix stop for the night, unaware they are in a Roman camp. Next morning, they beat up the Romans, but then surrender after learning the centurion intended to take them to Tolosa by cart. The Gauls are chained up, but repeatedly break their chains, much to the blacksmith's dismay. Out on the road, the centurion rides on ahead to bring over the prefect, but in his absence, Asterix and Obelix beat up the Romans again, make off with the cart, and buy sausages in Tolosa.

Aginum (Agen): The Romans announce a 50,000 sestertii reward for information leading to the arrest of Asterix and Obelix. An unscrupulous innkeeper, Uptotrix, invites the two Gauls to his inn, where he gives them a bag of prunes and serves them drugged boar. Suspecting betrayal, Asterix orders Uptotrix to taste the boar, which causes him to fall unconscious, although Obelix is unaffected despite eating the rest of the boar. The pair leaves the cart in Aginum and takes the horses, one of which collapses under the combined weight of Obelix and the shopping bag.

Burdigala (Bordeaux): En route, the Gauls rest for the night by a roadside, where their bag is stolen by two Roman highwaymen, Villanus and Unscrupulus. The next morning, Asterix and Obelix pursue the thieves, who are caught by a Roman patrol and mistaken them for the Gauls. In the town square of Burdigala, General Motus shows the "Gaulish outlaws" to the public, only to realize he has the wrong men when Asterix and Obelix arrive to reclaim their bag. The public attacks General Motus and his men while the heroes regain their bag and buy oysters and white wine.

Gesocribatum (Le Conquet): Before leaving Burdigala, Asterix and Obelix spy a ship offloading menhirs and meet Captain Seniorservix, who is honored to let them aboard as Obelix helps unload the menhirs before the ship's departure. At sea, the ship runs into the recurring pirates, whose own ship is sunk by the Gauls. On arrival in Gesocribatum, Seniorservix smuggles the Gauls ashore in sacks. Asterix and Obelix get out when a Roman patrol is passing by, but they beat up the Romans and escape.

Eventually, Asterix and Obelix reach the stockade outside their village and, after beating up the Romans yet again, give them a message to tell Overanxius they have won their side of the bet.  That night, Asterix shows the food and wine to Overanxius and Lotuseatus, before demonstrating the village's specialty, 'the uppercut', which knocks out Overanxius. Moments before the punch, Dogmatix barks for the first time, making Obelix notice him. Dogmatix is given a bone and the villagers enjoy their banquet.

List of items
 Lutetia (Paris): ham
 Camaracum (Cambrai): humbugs (in the English translation; in the original a similar sweet called "Bêtises de Cambrai")
 Durocortorum (Reims): Champagne (not named as such)
 Lugdunum (Lyon): sausages and quenelles
 Nicæ (Nice): Niçoise salad (named "Nicæoise" salad)
 Massilia (Marseille) fish stew (i.e. bouillabaisse)
 Tolosa (Toulouse): sausages
 Aginum (Agen): prunes
 Burdigala (Bordeaux): oysters and white wine

Cultural references
The idea of the story (and its French title) was inspired by the  Tour de France bicycle race. The sack carried by Obelix reflects the race leader's jersey colour (yellow — with a patch for the number).
The Latin phrase "Exegi monumentum aere perennius" is uttered by a legionnaire during the construction of a wall (page 7).  This is a reference to the same quote made by the Roman poet Horace. Translated, it means: "I have erected a monument more lasting than bronze."
Fun is poked at various French regional stereotypes:
The inhabitants of Normandy are shown as being unable to give a direct answer.
 The traffic jams in Paris (Lutetia in the comic strip) are spoofed.
 The phrase: "Je vous promets qu'on n'a pas fini d'en parler de l'affaire du courrier de Lugdunum!" is a reference to the trial "Le courrier de Lyon", where an innocent man was executed for the robbery of a mail coach and the murder of its occupants in 1796.
 The inhabitants of Lutetia (Paris) are shown going to Nicæ (Nice) for their summer holiday. (Obelix refers to Nicae as the "Gaulish Riviera".) Like modern Parisian travelers, the visitors from Lutetia cause huge traffic jams with their carts on the road into Nicæ, and huge crowds on the beach.
 The inhabitants of Massilia (Marseille) are hot-blooded and shown to exaggerate enormously.
The maze of back alleys in Lugdunum is a reference to the traboules of Lyon and the role they played during the French Resistance.
The idea of using pebbles to find one's way back is a reference to Hansel and Gretel or the French fairy tale Hop o' My Thumb. However a 'helpful' Roman Soldier picks up the pebbles for the Roman Official, trapping him in the maze also.
The scenes in the tavern in Massilia on page 36 are references to the films Marius (1931), Fanny (1932) and César (1936) by Marcel Pagnol, all of which are set in Marseille. The characters are caricatures of the actors in the films, including Raimu. . The card game scene is a reference to "Marius" and the pétanque scene to "Fanny". Reacting to this affectionate parody, Pagnol said, "Now I know that my work will be immortal...because it's appeared in Astérix!" 
After Asterix and Obelix sink the pirates' ship, Pegleg quotes Lucan in The Pharsalia: "Victrix causa diis placuit, sed victa catoni." ("The victorious cause was pleasing to the gods, but the lost cause was pleasing to Cato.")

Notes
 On the cover of the album, the sack is coloured incorrectly (green with a yellow patch).
 In the original French version, the camp centurion in this story (Gracchus Nenjetépus) is the same as that of the previous volume, Asterix the Gladiator — the only time a centurion appears in more than one album. However, in all major translations, he is given a different name in this volume (in the English version, he is named Gracchus Armisurplus in Asterix the Gladiator, and Lotuseatus in this album).
 Dogmatix is introduced in this book. He is first seen outside the pork butcher's shop in Lutetia. He follows Asterix and Obelix (who do not notice him during the entire journey) all across Gaul back to their village. Obelix notices him before the victory feast because he barks for the very first time and is rewarded with a bone.
 Dogmatix was originally supposed to be a literal running gag for this story alone. However, the authors decided he should stay in the series as a mascot, thus violating Goscinny's original no-pets rule.
 In the first version, the tour was supposed to go the other way around.
 In another initial version, other towns were considered but eliminated for lack of space:
 Cæsarodunum (Tours): rillettes
 Vesunna (Périgueux): foie gras
 Bæterræ (Béziers): wine
 Arelate (Arles): sausage
 Cabello (Cavaillon): melons
 Cularo (Grenoble): walnuts (in French, "Grenoble nuts")
 Genabum (Orléans): aromatic vinegar
 Suindinum (Le Mans): chicken.
 This marks the introduction of the running gag of Obelix vehemently protesting the implication that he is fat; while he had referred to himself as 'medium' in size in Asterix and the Goths, in Asterix the Gladiator Asterix informed him that he was too fat to pose as a lion to infiltrate the Circus and Obelix merely commented that he wished he had known that, while here he shows evident anger at anyone who calls him fat or even indirectly refers to him as 'the fat man', claiming that he is 'just not skinny'.
 First time an Asterix book makes reference to past adventures.  The first instance being after Overanxius agrees to lift the stockade if the Gauls win the bet, Obelix tells him to give Asterix and Obelix's best regards to Caius Fatuous, whom the pair humiliated in Asterix the Gladiator.  The second reference to a previous adventure comes when Asterix and Obelix discover Lutetia's traffic problems haven't been sorted out since their last visit there, of which a footnote tells readers to look back at the book Asterix and the Golden Sickle.
The candy shop owner at Cambrai sings the lullaby Golden Slumbers from the play Patient Grissel after Asterix and Obelix knock out the Roman patrol.
 In October 2017, the book's original cover illustration, signed by the authors, was sold at a Paris auction for a record €1.4 million.
 And they never get Divodurum's specialties, like charcuterie or pate or even quiche.

Reception 
On Goodreads, the book has a score of 4.14 out of 5.

References

External links 
Asterix and the Banquet Official English Page

Banquet, Asterix and the

Comics set in Paris
Marseille in fiction
Works originally published in Pilote
Literature first published in serial form
1965 graphic novels
Works by René Goscinny
Comics by Albert Uderzo
Comics set in France
Cultural depictions of French people